Major Hoyt Sherman (November 21, 1827 – January 25, 1904), a member of the prominent Sherman family, was an American banker.

Biography
Hoyt Sherman was born in 1827 in Lancaster, Ohio, the son of Charles R. Sherman, Judge of the Ohio Supreme Court. He was the youngest of eleven children, brother of US Federal Judge Charles Taylor Sherman, US Senator John Sherman the distinguished Ohio statesman, and of Major General William T. Sherman of Civil War fame. Until eighteen years of age, Hoyt's time was divided between school and the printing office. In the spring of 1848 he came to Fort Des Moines, Iowa, then far out on the western frontier. In 1849 he was admitted to the bar and began to practice law, and also engaged in real estate business. In March of that year he was appointed by President Zachary Taylor postmaster of Des Moines, holding that position until the inauguration of President Franklin Pierce, when he resigned and was elected clerk of the District Court. President Abraham Lincoln appointed him the Army Paymaster at the start of the Civil War, with the rank of Major.

Upon his return, Hoyt teamed up with others and created Equitable of Iowa Insurance Company. During this time, he also gave his counsel, his time, and his money to ensure Des Moines had schools, including a college, a waterworks system, and many more facilities.

In 1854, he was the senior member of the banking house of Hoyt Sherman & Co., and upon the establishment of the State Bank of Iowa he became cashier of the Des Moines branch and was one of the directors on part of the State to supervise the system and guard the public interests. When the American Civil War began Mr. Sherman was appointed by President Abraham Lincoln paymaster in the Union army with the rank of major, holding the position for three years. He was one of the organizers of the Equitable Life Insurance Company of Iowa and for many years its general manager. That institution owes much of its stability and high standing to Major Sherman's reputation for integrity and skillful management.

In 1866, Major Sherman was a member of the House of the Eleventh General Assembly where he was chairman of the committee on railroads and a member of the committee of ways and means. In 1886, he was one of the founders of the Pioneer Lawmakers' Association and was one of its most influential members, serving as president and long a member of the executive committee. He contributed valuable historical articles to the Annals of Iowa on "Early Banking in Iowa," and on the "State Bank of Iowa." For many years he was the chief executive officer of the Associated Charities of Des Moines.

Sherman married Sarah Elvira Moulton (24 June 1837-1 March 1887) on December 25, 1855. One of their daughters, Adaline Moulton Sherman, was married to Frank Bestow Wiborg, and their children included Mary Hoyt Wiborg and Sara Sherman Wiborg.

Hoyt Sherman Place
In 1877 Hoyt Sherman built a grand manor; the structure is now a museum and performing arts center. The original house and gallery now display a collection of 19th- and 20th-century paintings, as well as elaborately carved 17th-century furniture and other rare artifacts. The mansion, now known as Hoyt Sherman Place, lent its name to the surrounding Des Moines neighborhood of Sherman Hill. For many years Hoyt Sherman Place has served as the headquarters for Des Moines Women's Club.  The house and theater are now under the management of the Hoyt Sherman Place Foundation.

See also

References

External links
 Sherman Genealogy Including Families of Essex, Suffolk and Norfolk, England By Thomas Townsend Sherman

1827 births
1904 deaths
American bankers
Businesspeople from Des Moines, Iowa
Politicians from Des Moines, Iowa
People from Lancaster, Ohio
People of Iowa in the American Civil War
Members of the Iowa House of Representatives
United States Army paymasters
Union Army officers
19th-century American businesspeople
Sherman family (U.S.)